Omuma is a Local Government Area in Rivers State, Nigeria. Its headquarters are in the town of Eberi. Its people are Igbo .

The postal code of the area is 512.

References

Local Government Areas in Rivers State
1999 establishments in Nigeria
1990s establishments in Rivers State